Andha Atit is a Bengali thriller drama film directed by Hiren Nag and produced by Asim Sarkar. The film was released on 7 July 1972 in the banner of Usha Films, starring Uttam Kumar, Supriya Devi, Kali Banerjee and Swarup Dutta. The music director was Shyamal Mitra.

Plot
Rakhal Das is a poor employee of the Postal department who is in severe need of money for the treatment of his only son. As a last resort, Rakhal takes the mail bag and drops it from a running train so that he can get it later. At the same time, a municipal van drops all the garbage there. He cannot find the bag or money so he goes to a moneylender named Dhananjay Das but he finds him dead and the police arrest him for the case of murder and theft. Years later, an excavation is going on and the said mail bag is found. A mystery begins from an old letter which was recovered from the garbage.

Cast
 Uttam Kumar
 Supriya Devi
 Kali Banerjee as Rakhal Das
 Swarup Dutta as Rakhal's son
 Gita Dey as Rakhal's wife
 Tarun Kumar
Bankim Ghosh as Balaram
 Khagesh Chakraborty
 Biren Chatterjee
 Basudeb Pal

References

External links

1972 films
Bengali-language Indian films
Indian detective films
Indian thriller drama films
1970s Bengali-language films
Films scored by Shyamal Mitra